John F. MacGovern (born July 14, 1951) is an American politician who represented the 2nd Middlesex District in the Massachusetts House of Representatives from 1983 to 1991. He was the Republican nominee in the Massachusetts's 5th congressional district election in 1990, losing to incumbent Chester G. Atkins 52% to 48%. He later moved to Vermont. He was an unsuccessful candidate for the Vermont Senate in 2004 and 2006. He unsuccessfully ran as the Republican nominee for the United States Senate seat held by Bernie Sanders in the 2012 election.

References

External links
 
 John MacGovern for Senate official campaign site

See also
United States Senate election in Vermont, 2012
United States House of Representatives elections, 1990

|-

1951 births
Dartmouth College alumni
Living people
Republican Party members of the Massachusetts House of Representatives
Politicians from Cambridge, Massachusetts
People from Harvard, Massachusetts
People from Windsor County, Vermont
Vermont Republicans
Candidates in the 2012 United States elections
Candidates in the 2018 United States Senate elections